Hugo Mantel (4 May 1907 – 11 February 1942) was a German footballer.

He played for teams like Dresdner SC and Eintracht Frankfurt. He also played 5 times for Germany between 1927 and 1933. In 1934 he moved to Inter then named Ambrosiana-Inter but failed to get a permission to play for he was a foreigner.

Personal life
Mantel was born on 4 May 1907 in the Bövinghausen district of Dortmund. Serving as a Gefreiter (private) in the Wehrmacht, he died in Berdychiv during World War II on 11 February 1942 at the age of 34.

References

External links
 Hugo Mantel at eintracht-archiv.de
 

1907 births
1942 deaths
Footballers from Dortmund
German footballers
Germany international footballers
Dresdner SC players
Eintracht Frankfurt players
Inter Milan players
German Army personnel killed in World War II
Association football midfielders
German Army soldiers of World War II
Military personnel from Dortmund